Mariya Brel (born 16 October 1982 in Mazyr, Belarus) is a Belarusian rower. She competed in the women's quadruple sculls at the 2004 Summer Olympics.

References

Living people
Belarusian female rowers
Olympic rowers of Belarus
Rowers at the 2004 Summer Olympics
1982 births
People from Mazyr
Sportspeople from Gomel Region